Simon James Ward Lewis (born 9 October 1978) is an English former first-class cricketer.

Lewis was born at Bolton in October 1978. He was educated at Ermysted's Grammar School, before going up to Jesus College, Cambridge. While studying at Cambridge, he played first-class cricket for Cambridge University Cricket Club from 1998 to 2000, making eleven appearances. Playing as a batsman and occasional wicket-keeper in the Cambridge side, Lewis scored 171 runs at an average of 10.05 and a highest score of 26.

References

External links

1978 births
Living people
People from Bolton
People educated at Ermysted's Grammar School
Alumni of Jesus College, Cambridge
English cricketers
Cambridge University cricketers